Villány Mountains is a relatively low mountain range located west from the town of Villány, in Baranya county, Southern Hungary.

Its highest summit, the Szársomlyó is just 442 metres high. The latter has an extraordinary flora: on its southern slopes, the climate is mediterranean; the percentage rate of mediterranean species is over 20%. On the top, the ruins of a medieval castle can be found. The territory is part of the Danube-Drava National Park. The range is made up of limestone.

See also
 Baranya county
 Geography of Hungary
 Transdanubia

Mountain ranges of Hungary